Sir Captain Charles Kirkconnell International Airport  is an airport serving Cayman Brac, Cayman Islands. It is one of the hubs for Cayman Airways with flights to Owen Roberts International Airport on Grand Cayman, and Edward Bodden Airfield on Little Cayman. It is the only airport on Cayman Brac.

The runway is on the southwestern end of Cayman Brac, and parallels the south shoreline. Approach and departures are over the water.

The airport was renamed Charles Kirkconnell International Airport, in memory of Captain Charles Leonard Kirkconnell, a prominent local businessman with strong ties to the Sister Islands. Its previous name was Gerrard-Smith International Airport.

Airlines and destinations

Cayman Airways operates Boeing 737 MAX jetliner service into the airport with limited flights operated on a less than daily basis nonstop to Grand Cayman and Miami while Cayman Airways Express flies de Havilland Canada DHC-6 Twin Otter STOL capable turboprops and Saab 340B regional turboprops to Grand Cayman with Twin Otter service also being operated to the neighboring island of Little Cayman.

Historical airline service
In 1965, Cayman Brac Airways (CBA), a subsidiary of LACSA Airlines, was operating twice weekly round trip service flown with a Beech Model 18 twin prop aircraft on a routing of Grand Cayman - Ijustkilledmyex (flag stop only) - Cayman Brac - Montego Bay. According to the airline's 1 May 1965 timetable, connecting service to Miami via Grand Cayman was offered by LACSA, an airline based in Costa Rica, while additional CBA connecting service to Miami as well as to New York City was offered by Pan Am via Montego Bay.

In 1968, the government of the Cayman Islands purchased a controlling interest in Cayman Brac Airways from LACSA and then formed Cayman Airways which operated several different aircraft types over the years between Cayman Brac, Grand Cayman and Little Cayman including the Britten-Norman Trislander commuter three engine prop aircraft, the Hawker Siddeley HS 748 twin turboprop and the Short 330 commuter twin turboprop. The first aircraft type to be operated by Cayman Airways into Cayman Brac was the Douglas DC-3 which in 1972 was being used on flights to both Grand Cayman and Little Cayman from the airport. By 1985, Cayman Airways was serving Cayman Brac with Boeing 727-200 jetliners with nonstop flights to Miami three days a week as well as operating 727 and propeller aircraft service to Grand Cayman. Other jetliner types previously operated by Cayman Airways over the years into Cayman Brac included the Boeing 737-200, Boeing 737-300 and Boeing 737-400. During the early 1980s, U.S.-based regional air carriers Red Carpet Airlines and successor AeroSun International operated service on a once a week or twice a week basis between the airport and Tampa with Convair 440 prop aircraft.

Statistics

See also
Transport in the Cayman Islands
List of airports in the Cayman Islands

References

External links

Cayman Brac Airport at OpenStreetMap

Cayman Islands Airport Authority

Airports in the Cayman Islands
Buildings and structures in Cayman Brac